Dmitry Tursunov was the defending champion, but chose not to participate that year.Gaël Monfils won in the final 7–6(7–1), 3–6, 6–2 against Philipp Kohlschreiber.

Seeds

Draw

Finals

Top half

Bottom half

External links
 Main draw
 Qualifying draw

Singles